The Seventh Circuit Act of 1807 (formally, "An Act establishing Circuit Courts, and abridging the jurisdiction of the district courts in the districts of Kentucky, Tennessee and Ohio", ; 9th Congress, ch. 16; enacted February 24, 1807) was a federal statute which increased the size of the Supreme Court of the United States from six Justices to seven, and which also reorganized the circuit courts of the federal judiciary. The Act became law on February 24, 1807, during the Jefferson administration.

Text

Effect 

The Act created a new seat on the U.S. Supreme Court and required the new Associate Justice to reside in the seventh circuit.

Under the Act, the new seventh circuit consisted of Ohio, Kentucky and Tennessee.

In early 1807, the Act became law, and the justice first appointed to the new seat was Thomas Todd.

References

1807 in American law
United States federal judiciary legislation
History of the Supreme Court of the United States
9th United States Congress